is a Japanese former professional basketball player for Kanazawa Samuraiz of the B.League in Japan.He played college basketball for Senshu University. He was selected by the Osaka Evessa with the 4th overall pick in the 2006 bj League draft.

Stats

Regular season 

|-
| align="left" | 2004-05
| align="left" | Matsushita
| ||  ||  ||  ||  ||  ||  ||  ||  ||  ||  
|-
| align="left" | 2005-06
| align="left" | Matsushita
| ||  ||  ||  ||  ||  ||  ||  ||  ||  || 
|-
|  align="left"  style="background-color:#afe6ba; border: 1px solid gray" | 2006-07†
| align="left" | Osaka
| 24 || 0 || 5.7 || 50.0 || - ||50.0 ||0.8 || 0.2 || 0.1 || 0.1 ||  0.8 
|-
|  align="left"  style="background-color:#afe6ba; border: 1px solid gray" | 2007-08†
| align="left" | Osaka
| 8 || 0 || 3.1 || 0.0 || - || 50.0 || 1.2 || 0.0 || 0.0 || 0.0 || 0.2
|-
| align="left" | 2008-09
| align="left" | Shiga
| 51 || 28 || 10.7 || 53.3 || - || 50.0 || 2.5 || 0.1 || 0.1 || 0.1 || 1.4
|-
| align="left" | 2009-10
| align="left" | Shiga
| 23 || 0 || 3.7 || 55.6 || - || 66.7 || 0.7 || 0.0 || 0.0 || 0.0 || 0.5
|-
| align="left" | 2010-11
| align="left" | Shiga
| 21 || 0 || 5.4 || 50.0 || - || 0.0 || 1.4 || 0.1 || 0.0 || 0.0 || 0.4
|-
| align="left" | 2011-12
| align="left" | Mitsubishi
| 16 || 0 || 3.1 || 33.3 || - || 50.0 || 0.6 || 0.0 || 0.1 || 0.1 || 0.2
|-
| align="left" | 2012-13
| align="left" | Shimane
| 7 || 0 || 2.7 || - || - || - || 0.0 || 0.0 || 0.1 || 0.0 || 0.0
|-
| align="left" | 2013-14
| align="left" | Osaka
| 17 || 1 || 2.4 || 100 || - || - || 0.4 || 0.1 || 0.0 || 0.0 || 0.1
|-
| align="left" | 2014-15
| align="left" | Osaka
| 16 || 0 || 2.9 || - || - || - || 0.3 || 0.0 || 0.0 || 0.0 || 0.0
|-
| align="left" | 2015-16
| align="left" | Nishinomiya
| 11 || 0 || 2.5 || 100 || - || 0.0 || 0.5 || 0.0 || 0.0 || 0.0 || 0.2
|-
| align="left" | 2016-17
| align="left" | Ibaraki
| 49 || 17 || 3.5 || 50.0 || - || 50.0 || 0.8 || 0.0 || 0.1 || 0.0||0.2
|-
| align="left" |  2017-18
| align="left" | Akita
|20 || 4 || 5.2 ||25  || - ||0  || 0.6 || 0.1 || 0.1 ||0.1 ||0.2   
|-
| align="left" |  2018-19
| align="left" | Nishinomiya
|16 || 1 || 3.18 ||100  || 0 ||0  || 0.8 || 0.1 || 0 ||0 ||0.1   
|-
| align="left" |  2019-20
| align="left" | Kanazawa
|39 || 3 || 7.4 ||44.4  || 0 ||55.6  || 1.3 || 0.0 || 0 ||0 ||0.3   
|-

Playoffs 

|-
|style="text-align:left;"|2010-11
|style="text-align:left;"|Shiga
| 1 ||  || 1.0 || 1.000 || .000 || .000 || 0.0 || 1.0 || 0.0 || 0.0 ||2.0
|-

Early cup games 

|-
|style="text-align:left;"|2017
|style="text-align:left;"|Akita
| 2 || 0 || 6.44 || .500 || .000 || .250 || 1.0 || 0.0 || 0.5 || 0 || 1.5
|-
|style="text-align:left;"|2018
|style="text-align:left;"|Nishinomiya
| 3 || 0 || 9.17 || .333 || .000 || .500 || 1.0 || 0.3 || 0.33 || 0 || 1.0
|-

Personal
His father Tetsuo Sato is an Olympic medalist in volleyball. His cousin Kosuke Ishii is a professional basketball player for the Sun Rockers Shibuya of the B.League.

References

1981 births
Living people
Akita Northern Happinets players
Cyberdyne Ibaraki Robots players
Japanese men's basketball players
Kanazawa Samuraiz players
Osaka Evessa players
Nagoya Diamond Dolphins players
Nishinomiya Storks players
Panasonic Trians players
Senshu University alumni
Shiga Lakes players
Shimane Susanoo Magic players
Sportspeople from Kanagawa Prefecture
Centers (basketball)